Microworld is the world as it exists at a microscopic scale. Besides, it may also refer to:

 Microworld (video game), a 1981 text adventure game
 MicroWorlds, a computer program using the Logo programming language
 MicroWorlds JR
 Microworlds: Writings on Science Fiction and Fantasy, a 1984 book by Stanisław Lem
 Nature's Microworlds, a 2012 British nature documentary series
 Applied Technology, a company also known as Microworld